The siege of Frankenthal was a siege of the Palatinate campaign during the Thirty Years' War. A Spanish army under Gonzalo Fernández de Córdoba besieged the Palatinate fortified city of Frankenthal and its mostly English garrison commanded by John Burroughs. The siege lasted from 1621 to March 20, 1623, when King James I ordered the city to surrender.

Background
In the early seventeenth century, the city's fortifications were upgraded by Frederick IV, Elector Palatine in preparation for war. Frederick also refortified Heidelberg and created the fortress-city of Mannheim. Frankenthal had an important strategic role within the Electorate of the Palatinate.

On May 23, 1618, the Kingdom of Bohemia rose in revolt against Ferdinand II, Holy Roman Emperor and offered the crown to Frederick V, Elector Palatine, who, by accepting the Bohemian offer, brought the Electorate of the Palatinate into the war, thus broadening the conflict.

References

1621 in Europe
Conflicts in 1621
1622 in Europe
Conflicts in 1622
1623 in Europe
Conflicts in 1623
Wars involving the Holy Roman Empire
Wars involving Spain
Wars involving England
Battles of the Thirty Years' War
History of the Palatinate (region)
Electoral Palatinate
Battles in Rhineland-Palatinate